Rebecca Tamás is a British poet, writer, critic and editor, the daughter of Hungarian philosopher and public intellectual Gáspár Miklós Tamás. She was born in London in 1988. She studied creative writing at the University of Warwick and at the University of Edinburgh, where she won the Grierson Verse Prize, before completing a PhD at the University of East Anglia. She is a lecturer in creative writing at York St John University where she co-convenes The York Centre for Writing Poetry Series. She is the editor, with Sarah Shin, of the anthology Spells: 21st-century Occult Poetry (Ignota Press, 2018). She has published three pamphlets of poetry: The Ophelia Letters (Salt, 2013), Savage (Clinic, 2017) and Tiger (Bad Betty Press, 2018), and the full-length poetry collection Witch (Penned in the Margins, 2019). In 2020 she published the prose collection Strangers: Essays on the Human and Nonhuman.

Works

Poetry 

 The Ophelia Letters (Salt Publishing, 2013) 
 Savage (Clinic, 2017) 
 Tiger (Bad Betty Press, 2018)
 WITCH (Penned in the Margins, 2019)

Essay 

 Strangers: Essays on the Human and Nonhuman (Makina Books, 2020)

Awards 

 2016: Manchester Poetry Prize
 2017: Fenton Arts Trust Emerging Writer Award
 2017: London Review of Books Bookshop Pamphlet of the Year

References

Living people
1988 births
Writers from London
20th-century British poets
21st-century British poets
20th-century British women writers
21st-century British women writers
Alumni of the University of Warwick
Alumni of the University of Edinburgh
People associated with York St John University
British women essayists
Alumni of the University of East Anglia